Mandela's nudibranch, Mandelia mirocornata,  is a species of sea slug, a dorid nudibranch. It is a marine gastropod mollusc, the only member of the genus Mandelia and the family Mandeliidae. The genus and family name honor Nelson Mandela, the former President of South Africa.

Distribution
This species has so far only been found around the southern African coast from the Atlantic coast of the Cape Peninsula to Port Elizabeth in 10–400 m of water. It is probably endemic.

Description

Mandela's nudibranch has a bumpy dirty white to brown skin. It has black spots scattered over the notum. Its gills and rhinophores are large and creamy-coloured. The rhinophores are perfoliate, but are oblong rather than round. The animal may also have irregular brown stripes rather than spots on the notum, radiating out to the margins. It may reach a total length of 70 mm.

Ecology
This species feeds on sponges.

See also
 List of organisms named after famous people (born 1900–1949)

References

External links
 Mandelia mirocornata at nudipixel 

Endemic fauna of South Africa
Mandeliidae
Gastropods described in 1999
Nelson Mandela